These are the songs that reached number one on the Top 40 Best Sellers chart (expanded to the Top 50 as of October 13) in 1951 as published by Cash Box magazine. Artists were not specified in the charts of this period so songs may represent more than one version. The artist who most popularized each song is listed.

See also
1951 in music
List of number-one singles of 1951 (U.S.)

References
https://web.archive.org/web/20110515183302/http://cashboxmagazine.com/archives/50s_files/1951.html

1951
1951 record charts
1951 in American music